Zenit, meaning "zenith", may refer to:

Spaceflight and rocketry
 Zenit (rocket family), a Soviet family of space launch vehicles
 Zenit (satellite), a type of Soviet spy satellite
 Zenit sounding rocket, a Swiss rocket

Sports
 Zenit (sports society), a USSR and Russian sports society
 FC Zenit Saint Petersburg, football club
 BC Zenit Saint Petersburg, basketball club
 VC Zenit-Kazan, a volleyball club from Kazan city, Tatarstan, Russia
 FC Zenit (disambiguation), a number of European football clubs
 Zenit Nisko, former name of Sokół Nisko, a Polish football club

Other uses
 Zenit (album), a 2019 album by Austrian rapper RAF Camora
 Zenit (camera), a Russian camera brand produced by KMZ
 Zenit (Saint Petersburg Metro), a station on the Saint Petersburg Metro line 3
 Zenit News Agency, a former international news agency covering the Catholic Church
 Zenit, a magazine reviewing Croatian art of the 20th century

People with the given name
 Zenit Đozić (born 1961), Bosnian actor, humorist, and television producer

See also
 Zenith (disambiguation)